The Squash at the 2010 Commonwealth Games was held at the Siri Fort Sports Complex, New Delhi. Singles play took place from 4 October.

Nick Matthew defeated James Willstrop 11–6, 11–7, 11–7 in 66 minutes to win the gold medal.

Medalists

Seeds

  Nick Matthew (champion)
  James Willstrop (final)
  Peter Barker   (semifinals)
  Daryl Selby  (quarterfinals)
  David Palmer (quarterfinals)
  Mohd Azlan Iskandar  (semifinals)
  Cameron Pilley  (quarterfinals)
  Stewart Boswell (quarterfinals)
  Ong Beng Hee (third round)
  Aamir Atlas Khan (third round)
  Saurav Ghosal (third round)
  Shahier Razik (first round, withdrew due to injury)
  Farhan Mehboob (third round)
  Ryan Cuskelly (third round)
  Martin Knight (second round)
  Campbell Grayson (third round)

Draws and results

Finals

Top Half

Section 1

Section 2

Bottom Half

Section 1

Section 2

References

Squash at the 2010 Commonwealth Games